Daylight is the fifteenth studio album by English band the Selecter. It was released on 6 October 2017 through DMF Music.

Critical reception
SF Weekly wrote that the album "hears the group as energized as ever for an urgent and powerful record proving that the group is still open to creative evolution." LA Weekly called the album "engagingly soulful." Uncut wrote that "much of this is rather pedestrian ska with blandly topical lyrics."

Track listing
All tracks composed by Pauline Black, Arthur Hendrickson and Neil Pyzer; except where noted

Personnel
The Selecter
Pauline Black - vocals
Arthur "Gaps" Hendrickson - vocals
Neil Pyzer - saxophone, guitar, keyboards, vocals, string arrangements
Will Crewdson - guitar
Luke Palmer - bass guitar
Lee Horsley - organ
Orlando La Rose - saxophone, flute, piccolo flute
Winston Marche - drums
with:
Tim Bran - piano (on tracks 2, 4, 5, 8, 10), keyboards on "Daylight", string arrangements
John Robertson - guitar on "Remember Me" and "Things Fall Apart"
Adrian Large - guitar on "Paved With Cold", "Things Fall Apart" and "Pass the Power"
Jools Holland - piano on "Daylight"
Graham Cuttill - percussion
James Lawrence - trombone (on tracks 1. 3, 5-7, 10)
Audrey Riley, Chris Tombling - strings on "Daylight", "Mayhem" and "Pass the Power"
Beverley Skeete - backing vocals
Marizia Pyzer-Skeete - backing vocals on "Taking Back Control"

Chart

References

External links

2017 albums
The Selecter albums